Transport in Estonia relies mainly on road and rail networks.

Roads 

Total: 57,565 km (including 16,465 km of national roads)
Paved: 12,926 km (including 99 km of limited-access roads)

National roads

National roads form the core of Estonian road network. Their total length is 16,489 km (or 28% of all roads), 67% of them are paved. They are divided into 4 classes according to importance:
main roads (1,607 km)
basic roads (2,406 km)
secondary roads (12,476 km)
local roads (18,455 km)

Electric vehicle network
Estonia is the first country in the EU and in the world to introduce a nationwide, publicly serviced charging system for charging the batteries of electric vehicles. The 165 fast charging stations are equipped with connectors of the CHAdeMO standard. They are located throughout the entire country, including the islands, and have a maximum distance of 40–60 km in between. The charging stations can also be navigated via a smartphone app (currently only for Android). The relatively dense network and 30 minute quick charges are built to enable a country-wide electric vehicle network. The system offers a unitary booking service and several different tariffs, some of which appear attractively low priced. The charging station network puts Estonia at the forefront in Europe even though Norway actually has a higher penetration of electric vehicles. Estonia has a rate of 1 electric vehicle per 1,000 capita, whereas Norway has 4 EVs per 1,000 capita.

Railways 

Total: 900 km common carrier lines only (1,200 km including dedicated industrial lines)
Broad gauge: 900 km  or  gauge (133 km electrified)

Railway links with adjacent countries 
  Latvia – yes – same  gauge
  Russia – yes – same  gauge

Light rail

There has been a growing tram network in Tallinn, Estonia since 1888, when traffic was started by horse-powered trams. The first line was electrified on October 28, 1925. The first electric trams were built by Dvigatel, Ltd., in Tallinn before World War II and for some years after that, the last one in 1954. In the 1920s and 1930s gas-powered trams were also used. Since 1955 to 1988 German-built trams were used. In total, there were 20 LOWA T54-B54 trams (in use from February 1955 to March 1977), 11 Gotha T57-B57 (in use from January 1958 to June 1978), 5 Gotha T59E-B59E (in use from June 1960 to February 1980), 14 Gotha T2-62 and B2-62 (in use from 1962 to 1981) and 50 Gotha G4 trams (in use from January 1965 to October 1988) trams. The first Czechoslovakian-built ČKD Tatra T4SU arrived in 1973. The T4SU trams were in use from May 1973 to September 2005 and there were 60 of them. The first KT4SU arrived in Tallinn in 1981 and was first in use on March 10, 1981. In 2007, there are 56 KT4SU, 12 KTNF6 (rebuilt KT4SUs, 10 local, one from Gera and one from Erfurt) and 23 KT4D (12 from Gera, 6 from Cottbus, 1 from Frankfurt (Oder) and 5 from Erfurt) in use. As of 2018, there are four lines: 1 (Kopli-Kadriorg), 2 (Kopli-Ülemiste), 3 (Tondi-Kadriorg) and 4 (Tondi-Lennujaam (Airport)). There have also been lines 5 (Kopli-Vana-Lõuna, shut down in 2004 because of small usage) and 6 (Kopli-Tondi, temporarily used in time of repairs).

Ports and Harbours 
Estonia has 45 ports in the State Port Register. With a few exceptions, all of them are on the Baltic Sea.

Largest ports are Muuga (near Tallinn), Tallinn (comprises several ports), Paldiski, Kunda, Pärnu and Sillamäe.

Merchant marine 
Since 2014, there have been no vessels over 500gt on the Estonian register. About 60 merchant vessels are beneficially owned in Estonia, with most of them registered in Malta. The government has started a drive to bring more of these vessels back into the Estonian register.

Airports

Airports – with paved runways 
total: 13 (2013)
over 3,047 m: 2
2,438 to 3,047 m: 8
1,524 m to 2,437 m : 2
914 to 1,523 m: 1

Lennart Meri Tallinn Airport is the largest airport in Estonia.

Pipelines 
 Natural gas 859 km (2007)

Waterways 
 320 km perennially navigable

Currently operating water transport routes:
 International:
Tallinn – Helsinki ferry and (seasonal) high-speed craft
Tallinn – Mariehamn (Åland) – Stockholm ferry
Paldiski – Kappelskär (Sweden) ferry
Tallinn – Visby (Gotland) (seasonal cruise) ferry
 Domestic:
Western Estonia:
Rohuküla – Sviby (Vormsi Island) ferry
Rohuküla – Heltermaa (Hiiumaa Island) ferry
Sõru (Hiiumaa Island) – Triigi (Saaremaa Island) ferry
Virtsu – Kuivastu (Muhu Island) ferry
Pärnu – Kihnu Island boat-ferry
Munalaid – Kihnu Island boat-ferry
Munalaid – Manilaid Islet boat-ferry and boat
Roomassaare (Saaremaa Island) – Abruka Island boat-ferry and boat
Munalaid – Ruhnu Island (charter) ferry and (seasonal) high-speed craft-ferry
Pärnu – Ruhnu Island (seasonal) high-speed craft-ferry
Roomassaare (Saaremaa Island) – Ruhnu Island (seasonal) high-speed craft-ferry
Rohuküla – Hobulaid Islet (charter) boat
Northern Estonia:
Leppneeme – Prangli Island boat-ferry
Tallinn – Aegna Island (seasonal) boat
Tallinn – Naissaar Island (seasonal) boat
Dirhami – Osmussaar Island (seasonal) boat
Kurkse – Väike-Pakri Island (charter) boat
Lake Peipus and Emajõgi River:
Laaksaare – Piirissaar Island ferry
Kavastu (seasonal) cable ferry across Emajõgi River

See also 

 M/S Estonia
 TS Laevad – ferry company serving the major islands
 Kihnu Veeteed – ferry company serving mainly smaller islands

References